The Cuervos de Ensenada JAP Fútbol Club, commonly known as Cuervos de Ensenada, is a Mexican football club based in Ensenada, Baja California. The club was founded on 2016, and recently plays in the Liga Premier de Ascenso of Segunda División de México.

Players

Current squad

References

External links 

Ensenada, Baja California
Association football clubs established in 2016
Football clubs in Baja California
2016 establishments in Mexico
Segunda División de México